The 2016–17 Bradley Braves men's basketball team represented Bradley University during the 2016–17 NCAA Division I men's basketball season. The Braves, led by second-year head coach Brian Wardle, played their home games at Carver Arena in Peoria, Illinois as members of the Missouri Valley Conference. They finished the season 13–20, 7–11 in MVC play to finish in a tie for sixth place. As the No. 7 seed in the MVC tournament, they defeated Drake in the first round before losing to Wichita State in the quarterfinals.

Previous season
The Braves finished the 2015–16 season 5–27, 3–15 in Missouri Valley play to finish in ninth place. They lost in the first round of the Missouri Valley tournament to Loyola–Chicago.

Preseason
The Missouri Valley Conference's preseason poll picked Bradley to finish in eighth place in the MVC.

Offseason

Departures

Incoming Transfers

2016 recruiting class

2017 Recruiting class

Roster

Schedule and results

|-
! colspan="9" style=| Exhibition

|-
! colspan="9" style=|  Non-conference regular season

 

 

|-
! colspan="9" style=| Missouri Valley Conference regular season

|-
! colspan="9" style=|  Missouri Valley tournament

Source

References

Bradley Braves men's basketball seasons
Bradley
Bradley Braves men's basketball
Bradley Braves men's basketball